The 2004 WGC-World Cup took place 18–21 November at the Real Club de Golf de Seville in Seville, Spain. It was the 50th World Cup and the fifth as a World Golf Championship event. 24 countries competed and each country sent two players. The prize money totaled $4,000,000 with $1,400,000 going to the winning pair. The English team of Paul Casey and Luke Donald won. They won by one stroke over the home Spanish team of Sergio García and Miguel Ángel Jiménez.

Qualification and format
18 teams qualified based on the Official World Golf Ranking and were joined by six teams via qualifiers in South America and Asia.

The tournament was a 72-hole stroke play team event with each team consisting of two players. The first and third days were fourball play and the second and final days were foursomes play.

Teams

Source

Scores

Source

References

External links
Real Club de Golf de Seville

World Cup (men's golf)
Golf tournaments in Spain
Sports competitions in Seville
WGC-World Cup
WGC-World Cup
World Cup golf
21st century in Seville